German Liberal Party may refer to one of the following:

 German Liberal Party (Danzig) (German: Deutschliberale Partei) active in the Free City of Danzig during the 1920s and early 1930s
 German-Liberal Party (Deutschliberale Partei), alternative name for the Constitutional Party (Austria), active in the Austro-Hungarian Monarchy from 1861 to 1881
 German Liberal Party (Czechoslovakia), active in Czechoslovakia around 1920

See also 
 Free Democratic Party, the main liberal party of today's Germany